The 2007 Calgary municipal election was held Monday, October 15, 2007. The citizens of Calgary elected one mayor, 12 of their 14 aldermen (one from each of 14 wards) to the city council, five of the seven Calgary School District trustees (each representing 2 of 14 wards), and three of the seven Calgary Catholic School District trustees (each representing 2 of 14 wards). All but one of the incumbent councillors ran again in this election (Barry Erskine, of Ward 11), and two incumbents were returned by acclamation. Five of the incumbent public school trustees ran again, two were acclaimed, and four separate school incumbent trustees ran, three were acclaimed, while Ward 13/14 had only one new candidate. Since 1968, provincial legislation has required every municipality to hold triennial elections.

The percent of eligible voters who voted was 33% — putting turnout at a higher level than the previous election in 2004.

Results
Bold indicates elected, italics indicates incumbent.

Mayor

Aldermen

Public School Trustees

Separate School Trustees

Key Issues
Some of the prominent issues receiving public attention include the following (listed in alphabetical order):

Crime
Recent high-profile violent crimes in Calgary had generated public concern for safety in the city.

Environment
Calgary has the highest per capita ecological footprint amongst Canada's larger cities. The City has concentrated past efforts on increasing community water conservation and reducing its corporate GHG emissions. Community goals to reduce the community's ecological footprint were identified through the Imagine Calgary process. These were intended to form the basis for comprehensive community-based initiatives to reduce the per capita ecological footprint.

Housing
There was an ongoing shortage of housing in the city. That, combined with what was among the highest rates of growth in housing costs in Canada, had made housing a significant issue for the public.

Infrastructure
A week before the election, the provincial government agreed to provide $3.3 billion for infrastructure in Calgary over the next 10 years. It would be up to city council to allocate those funds.

Transportation
 Disruption of roads, paths and sidewalks due to construction.
 Public transit infrastructure.
 Increasing motor-vehicle congestion.

Voter participation
Voter turnout in the previous Calgary municipal election was 19.8%, while in the 2001 municipal elections it was 38%.

Controversies
 Campaign finance.

Regarding specific candidates

 Sandy Jenkins was forcibly ejected from the University of Calgary MacEwan Hall Ballroom by security during a Weakerthans concert which he sneaked in after not having paid for a ticket.
 Dave Bronconnier's fundraising has raised concerns about the impact of funding on the campaign.
 Craig Burrows (incumbent, Ward 6) was the Chair of the City Audit Committee.  He was approved to take a University of Calgary business management course which would provide assistance to him in his role on the Audit Committee.  He was later asked to repay the course fee, which he did indirectly through a reduction in his spending in the subsequent year.
 Mayoral candidate Alnoor Kassam was reported to have spent a million dollars of his own money on his campaign, which led to allegations that his money had been acquired in illegal or unethical manners.  Columnist Don Braid attempted to connect him to a banking scandal in Kenya prior to moving to Canada. While Kassam did admit that the local political culture required regular bribes in order to do business, he noted that a Canadian immigration tribunal had completely exonerated him.  He insisted that he did not take money when leaving Kenya, but had made his entire current fortune in Calgary.  News articles also accused Kassam of attempting economic evictions in a Mount Royal apartment building, although he apparently also supported residents in finding other housing.

References

External links
 The City of Calgary: General Election

Calgary
2007
2000s in Calgary